The Sweltzer River is a river in British Columbia, Canada, that drains the waters of Cultus Lake into the Chilliwack River.

The name Sweltzer River was applied on an 1895 map to Liumchen Creek, which is to the northeast.

See also
List of rivers in British Columbia

References

Rivers of the Lower Mainland